is a district located in Shiribeshi Subprefecture, Hokkaidō, Japan.

As of 2004, the district has an estimated population of 22,977 and a density of 61.17 persons per km2. The total area is 375.60 km2.

Towns and villages
Iwanai
Kyōwa

Districts in Hokkaido